Naddah is a village in northern Aleppo Governorate, northwestern Syria.

The village administratively belongs to Nahiya Azaz in Azaz District. Nearby localities include Nayarah  to the northeast, and Yahmul  to the east. In the 2004 census, Naddah had a population of 305.

References

Populated places in Aleppo Governorate